The Manhae Prize is a series of awards in the following categories: Peace, Social Service, Academic Excellence, Art, Literature, and Buddhist Missionary Work awarded by The Society for the Promotion and Practice of Manhae's Thoughts in memory of Buddhist reformer and anti-Japanese independence activist Han Yong-un (1879–1944).

Awardees
See http://manhae2003.dongguk.edu/bbs/board.php?bo_table=manhae4_12&sca=20th]
Selected awardees with Wikipedia entries:

Peace prize winners
2015 Alxis Dudden, Professor of History at University of Connecticut, U.S.A
2014 Mohsen Makhmalbaf, Iranian film director
2013 World Fellowship of Buddhists
2009 Shirin Ebadi Iranian human rights advocate, winner of Nobel Prize for Peace
2008 Lokamitra (Jeremy Goody), member of the Triratna Buddhist Community

Practice prize winners
2015 Joint Winners :Cheoung-Jeoun Reverend of Buddhism, Korea, Rainbow Community - Noel-El Cheoun priest, from Republic of Ireland
2014 Se-Chung Lee, lawyer, Korea
2013 Dagon Taryar from Myanmar
2012 Kurt Gribl lawyer and Mayor of the Friedensstadt (Peace city) Augsburg, Germany

Literature prize winners
2015 Joint winners : Young-Bok shin professor, SoungKongHoe University, Korea, Hyon-Jong Jeong, Poet, Korea, Byong-Kee Hwang, Master of Korean classical music, Korea
2014 Joint winners: Ashraf Dali, Egyptian poet and writer  Yoon Yang-hee, calligrapher, Korea
2013 Konstantin Kedrov (poet), Ingo Schulze
2012 Kim Jay Hong
2011 Mo Yan
2010 Joint winners: John Ralston Saul President of International PEN, Jeong Jin-gyu editor of Modern Poetry, Seoul.
2009 Joint winners: Robert Hass, Kim Jong-gil
2008  Lee Eo-ryeong
2007 Kim Nam-jo
2006 Joint Winners: Robert Pinsky, Hwang Dong-gyu
2005 Wole Soyinka 
2004 Hong Seok-jung, first DPRK author.
2003 Jo Jung-rae
2002  Shin Kyung-rim
2001  Lee Hung-ki
2000 Oh Sae-young
1999 Chung Wan-young
1998 Ko Un (poet)
1990 Hyun Ki-young (novelist)

References

Peace awards
South Korean awards
South Korean literary awards
Annual events in South Korea